Ndenderu is a settlement in Kenya's Central Province.
It sits along the very leafy cold sides of Limuru. It's a ward(location) in Kiambaa Constituency Constituency of Kiambu County Represented by Solomon Kinuthia who was elected under Jubilee Party in 2017 General Elections.

Demographics
The region is predominantly inhabited by the Kikuyu tribe. 
It has a booming population as it's part of the larger Nairobi Metropolitan Area. It lies 15 km north of Nairobi, the capital of Kenya.

References 

Populated places in Central Province (Kenya)